Subgrouping in linguistics is the division of a language family into its constituent branches. In standard linguistic theory, subgroupings are determined based on shared innovations between languages.

References

Greenberg, Joseph H. 1957. "The problem of linguistic subgroupings", in Essays in Linguistics. Chicago: University of Chicago Press.

Language classification